Baron Gisborough, of Cleveland in the County of York, is a title in the Peerage of the United Kingdom. It was created in 1917 for the Conservative politician Richard Chaloner, who had previously represented Westbury (also known as Wiltshire West) and Abercromby in the House of Commons. Born Richard Long, the son of Richard Penruddocke Long, he had assumed by royal licence the surname of Chaloner in lieu of Long in 1881, as a condition of inheriting the Guisborough estate and Gisborough Hall from his maternal great-uncle, Admiral Thomas Chaloner. The latter was a descendant through his mother of Robert de Brus, who founded Gisborough Priory in 1119. Lord Gisborough's eldest son and heir, Richard Godolphin Hume Long Chaloner, was accidentally killed in France in 1917 while guarding German prisoners of war, and is buried at Calais. Lord Gisborough was therefore succeeded by his second son, the second Baron. , the title is held by the latter's son, the third Baron, who succeeded in 1951. He notably served as Lord Lieutenant of Cleveland from 1981 to 1996. The title remains strongly linked with the town of Guisborough.

The prominent Conservative politician Walter Long, 1st Viscount Long, was the elder brother of the first Baron.

Barons Gisborough (1917)
Richard Godolphin Walmesley Chaloner, 1st Baron Gisborough (1856–1938)
Thomas Weston Peel Long Chaloner, 2nd Baron Gisborough (1889–1951)
(Thomas) Richard John Long Chaloner, 3rd Baron Gisborough (b. 1927)

The heir apparent is the present holder's son, the Hon. (Thomas) Peregrine Long Chaloner (b. 1961)

Arms

See also
Viscount Long
Chaloner baronets
Thomas Chaloner (statesman)
Thomas Chaloner (courtier)

References

Sources

 Kidd, Charles; Williamson, David (editors). Debrett's Peerage and Baronetage (1990 edition). New York: St Martin's Press, 1990,

External links
 Photograph in the National Portrait Gallery

Baronies in the Peerage of the United Kingdom

People from Guisborough
Noble titles created in 1917
Noble titles created for UK MPs